This is a list of 332 species in the genus Copestylum.

Copestylum species

References